Pakka Inti Ammayi is a 1953 Indian Telugu-language romantic comedy film directed by C. Pullayya. The film featured Anjali Devi as the beautiful neighbour girl. Famous comedian Relangi acted as her lover Subbarayudu and veteran South Indian singer A. M. Rajah as his friend. It was produced by East Indian Company. 

It is a remake of the Bengali film Pasher Bari (1952), itself based on the namesake short story by Arun Chowdhury. The film was remade in Telugu with the same name in 1981 by K. Vasu.

Plot 
Subbarayudu (Relangi) stays next to the house of Heroine Leela Devi (Anjali Devi). She madly likes dance and music. She appoints a music teacher Prem Kumar (Narayana Rao). She does not like the actions of Subbarayudu, but he likes her very much and even loves her. He takes the help of some friends and impresses her that he knows music very well. She involves her teacher Prem Kumar against Subbarayudu. He takes the help of his friend (A. M. Rajah) and mimes as if singing good songs, while Rajah is singing from the background. As a result, the heroine almost likes him. But after knowing that he is not the singer, she changes her mind. Subbarayudu acts suicidal because of her refusal. The heroine finally changes her mind and loves him.

Cast 
 Relangi as  Subbarayudu
 Anjali Devi as  Leela Devi
 Addala Narayana Rao as Prem Kumar
 A. M. Rajah as Raja
 Kamaladevi
 Mohana Krishna
 Gangaratnam
 Shakuntala
 C. S. Rao as Gas Lodge leader
 V. V. Tatachari as friend of Subbarayudu
 R. K. Rao as friend of Subbarayudu

Songs 
 "Kalayemo Idi Naa Jeevita Phalamemo" (Singer: A. M. Rajah)
"Pasi Papa Mana" - P. Susheela
"Ae Teeruna Galamu" - P. Susheela
"Ee Geetika Galamunu" - P. Susheela
"O Gulabi Puvvu" - P. Susheela
"Vasantha Kalam" - P. Susheela
"Nannalarinchuta Nyayamera" - P. Susheela

References

External links 
 

1950s Telugu-language films
1953 films
1953 romantic comedy films
Films based on short fiction
Films directed by C. Pullayya
Indian black-and-white films
Indian romantic comedy films
Telugu remakes of Bengali films
Films scored by Ashwatthama